Clara Torr (1868–1934) was a British music hall comedian.

Biography 

Torr was an English music hall comedian, soprano and dancer. She was the daughter of Sam Torr, a noted music hall entertainer, and Elizabeth Wood.  Clara performed comic songs such as: "The Dear Old Stile" and "My Mother", which she also composed.

External links 

 COPAC – lists Clara Torr's Music Hall Songs that are available at the Oxford, Cambridge and British Libraries.
 British Music Hall Society
 Hudd Music Hall Archive

1868 births
1934 deaths
People from Nottingham
Music hall performers
English women singers